Logan Astley (born 18 May 2003) is an English professional rugby league footballer who plays as a  and  for the Wigan Warriors in the Betfred Super League.

In 2022 Astley made his Super League début for Wigan against the Huddersfield Giants.

References

External links
Wigan Warriors profile

2003 births
Living people
English rugby league players
Oldham R.L.F.C. players
Rugby league halfbacks
Rugby league players from Billinge, Merseyside
Wigan Warriors players